Anthony Seymour may refer to:

Anthony Seymour, son of John Seymour (1474–1536)
Anthony Seymour, character in Dangerous Innocence

See also
Tony Seymour (disambiguation)